Mark Healey is a British video game developer from Ipswich, Suffolk. Healey started his career making games for the Commodore 64 home computer – his first published game was KGB Super Spy for Codemasters, which led to developing the educational Fun School series of games for Europress Software. Healey joined Bullfrog Productions to work with Peter Molyneux on titles such as Magic Carpet and Dungeon Keeper. When Molyneux left Bullfrog to form Lionhead Studios, Healey joined him, and worked as a senior artist on Black & White and Fable. Whilst still at Lionhead, he developed Rag Doll Kung Fu independently in his spare time, which was the first third party game to be distributed over Steam - Valve's online distribution system. He is a co-founder of Media Molecule and creative director of LittleBigPlanet and LittleBigPlanet 2.

References

External links

Mark Healey at mediamolecule.com

Mark Healey (video game person) at Giant Bomb

Year of birth missing (living people)
20th-century births
Living people
British video game designers
Bullfrog Productions
Creative directors
Lionhead Studios
Media Molecule
Video game artists